Isolona heinsenii is a species of plant in the Annonaceae family. It is endemic to Tanzania.

References

Flora of Tanzania
heinsenii
Endangered plants
Taxonomy articles created by Polbot